Daredevils is a tabletop role-playing game published by Fantasy Games Unlimited (FGU) in 1982 that is meant to emulate pulp magazine fiction of the 1930s.

Description
Daredevils — subtitled "Roleplaying Action and Adventure in the Two-Fisted Thirties" — is a role-playing game set in a historically accurate Earth of the 1930s that is meant to recall the adventures of pulp magazine characters such as Doc Savage, Sam Spade, Allan Quatermain, and The Shadow, as well as detective novels and film noir detective films of the 1930s and 1940s. The player takes the persona of a detective cum pulp fiction hero. Adventures for Daredevils published in following years involve other themes that were popular in 1930s pulp magazines such as lost worlds, exotic locales, and supernatural horror. The game uses the Basic Chance of Success (BCS) system first developed for FGU's Bushido and Aftermath!.

Components
The boxed set contains:
 64-page rulebook that describes the characters' abilities, their careers, skills, movements, forms of combat (with an emphasis on firearms), vehicles, and an overview of life in the 1930s. The book also describes the creation of the game and lists prominent non-player characters.
 32-page Daredevil Adventures booklet that contains four mini-scenarios 
 gamemaster's screen
 blank character sheet
 dice

Character generation
Character generation is a combination of random dice rolls to generate six abilities and a "point-buy" system for skills.

Skill resolution
To determine the success or failure of attempted actions, the player divides the character's score in the relevant Skill by 5 (rounding down to the next whole number), and adds or subtracts any relevant factors as determined by the gamemaster. To gain success, the player must roll the resulting number or higher on a twenty-sided die.

Combat resolution  
Resolving success in combat uses the same basic system as for skill resolutions, but with a large number of additional factors such as Weapon Defense Ability, situational modifiers, restrictions, and distractions. If the character successfully scores a hit, the player then calculates a Damage Potential, which varies according to whether hand-to-hand weapons, firearms, or missile weapons were involved. Each hit also has the potential to be a critical hit, which requires further calculations. There are also a number of Special Combat Situations that can have an effect on the final outcome of both the hit and damage.

Scenarios
Four short scenarios were included:
"Fu Sung's Secret": An introductory adventure. The player characters are eating dinner in a Chinese restaurant when an acquaintance holding the remains of a fortune cookie collapses on their table, an ornate dagger in his back. 
"Fu Sung's Revenge": A sequel to the first adventure. The player characters are poisoned, and have only 24 hours to find the evil Fung Su, who has the antidote. This requires them to infiltrate his mansion and overcome thugs and a death trap.
"Black Claws": An adventure in Africa that involves the occult.
"On These Mean Streets": During American Prohibition, the player characters receive a note asking for their help, but when they reach the rendezvous, the woman who wrote the note has been murdered.

Publication history
Robert Charrette and Paul Hume developed the BCS role-playing system for the feudal Japanese  role-playing game Bushido in 1979. After refining the system for the science fiction game Aftermath (1981), Charrette and Hume designed Daredevils with a slightly streamlined BCS system. It was published by FGU in 1982 as a boxed set with interior and cover art by Charrette.       

Over the next three years, FGU published four books of adventures and two supplements, but Daredevils never developed a strong following. The complexity of the rules was noted by several reviewers, and in his 2014 book Designers & Dragons, game historian Shannon Appelcline commented, "It was probably still too awkward and it was only supported with four supplements."

Reception
In the February 1983 edition of Dragon (Issue 70), Ken Ralston found the game "does an admirable job in covering rules many of the important features of adventuring in the modern era of technology." But Ralston found reading the rules to be a slog, exacerbated by the lack of an index. "The style is dense and compressed, presumably because of the designer’s anxiety to include every bit of the detailed and clever rules created to handle combat, skills and tasks, character generation, and the trappings of technology." Ralston also found the combat system "particularly bewildering... It slows the rhythm of the game and distracts from the charming atmosphere so painstakingly developed." On the positive side, he found the character generation system to be "detailed but well organized", and the rules about electricity, locks and disease "entertaining and credible." Due to the complexity of the rules, Ralston felt that this game "is unlikely to attract a large audience." But he concluded, "Despite my reservations about the readability and complexity of the rules and procedures of Daredevils, it is the most comprehensive set of rules covering role-playing in the modern era, and shows great ingenuity in handling many gaming situations that are handled poorly or not at all by other systems. If the players avoid combat, the game plays smoothly and at a satisfying dramatic pace."

In the March 1983 edition of The Space Gamer (Issue No. 61), John Rankin commented that "Daredevils is a most interesting and satisfying game. Unless you didn't like the Aftermath/Bushido game system, at all, you should find Daredevils a more than adequate RPG to propel you into '30s action and adventure."

In the December 1983 edition of  Imagine (Issue 27), Paul Cockburn compared the game favorably to the earlier Gangbusters, and praised the realism of Daredevils in comparison to Call of Cthulhu. Cockburn also compared the game favorably to the adventures of Indiana Jones.

In the March 1983 edition of Different Worlds (Issue 27), Ken Rolston called the rules "artful, but frustratingly complex." He especially found the combat rules overly demanding, and as an example, took one-third of a page to outline all of the calculations needed to resolve one hit and its damage. While he praised the included scenarios for their investigative aspects, he had reservations about "the inherent weaknesses of '30's pulp fiction — implausible plots for heroes and villains in 'exotic' backgrounds." He warned gamemasters to be very familiar with the BCS rules before attempting combat, and concluded "There are many creative ideas in Daredevils, and it's a pleasurable evocation of the '30's adventure genres, but the rules are obscure and complex."

In the March 1984 edition of White Dwarf (Issue 51), Marcus Rowland found the character generation system complex, and combat "very complicated, using a lot of modifiers and intricate calculations to establish the result of each shot or blow." He gave the game an above average overall rating of 8 out of 10, saying, "The rules system is slightly top-heavy, and I suspect many referees will simplify or abandon some of the more awkward areas... I'd not recommend the system to beginners, but more experienced referees won't have much trouble using it.

In his 1987 book, Role-Playing Mastery, Dungeons & Dragons co-creator E. Gary Gygax included both Daredevils and Bushido in his short list of notable role playing games.

Other reviews
 Casus Belli #16 (Aug 1983)
 Alarums & Excursions #163 (March 1989)
 StarDrive Vol. 1 Issue 1 (January 1988)
Breakout! Issue 10 (1983)

Publications
Daredevil Adventures Vol. 2 No. 1: Deadly Coins
Daredevil Adventures Vol. 2 No. 2: The Menace Beneath the Sea
Daredevil Adventures Vol. 2 No. 3: Supernatural Thrillers Issue
Daredevil Adventures Vol. 2 No. 4: Lost World Tales
Daredevil Adventures Vol. 3 No. 1: Nefarious Plots

References

External links
 Daredevils listing at the RPG.net game index.
 Daredevils page at the Fantasy Games Unlimited website.

Fantasy Games Unlimited games
Historical role-playing games
Role-playing games introduced in 1982
Pulp and noir period role-playing games